Carleton Crematorium, together with the adjacent necropolis, Carleton Cemetery, is a graveyard located within the Greenlands ward of Blackpool with its main entrance on Stocks Road in Carleton, Poulton-le-Fylde, Lancashire, in England. It was opened on 18 July 1935.

The building was created by Blackpool Borough architect, J.C. Robinson, who based his design on his own interpretation of the Mausoleum of Mausolus. At the north door is a chapel containing Books of Remembrance, which note the names of all those cremated or interred there.

The site is located in Blackpool and partly in  Carleton, Poulton-le-Fylde, the crematorium comes under the jurisdiction of Blackpool Council.

Notable cremations and interments
A number of notable people have been buried or cremated at the site. These include

Carleton Cemetery
 Norman Evans, variety and radio artiste
 Frank Randle, comedian
 Arthur Worsley, ventriloquist

There are 88 Commonwealth service personnel of the Second World War buried at the cemetery.

Carleton Crematorium
 Ian Stuart Donaldson, white power singer, songwriter and guitarist.
 Lennie Bennett, comedian and game show host.
 Charlie Cairoli, clown, impressionist and musician
 Bernie Nolan, Singer, actress, TV personality.
 Violet Carson, actress
 Jimmy Clitheroe, comedian
 John Comer, actor
 Reginald Dixon, organist
 Roy Gratrix, professional footballer
 Hugh Kelly, professional football player and manager
 Tony Melody, television actor
 Stan Mortensen, professional footballer
 Beatrix Potter, author and illustrator, botanist, and conservationist, best known for her children's books

The Commonwealth War Graves Commission has erected a white stone memorial near the crematorium listing 51 Commonwealth service personnel cremated here during the Second World War.

Gallery

References

External links
 

Cemeteries in Lancashire
Crematoria in England
Buildings and structures in Blackpool
Beatrix Potter